Muruiyeh (also Romanized as Mūrū’īyeh and Mowrū’īyeh; also known as Mūreh) is a village in Khursand Rural District, in the Central District of Shahr-e Babak County, Kerman Province, Iran. At the 2006 census, its population was 1,520, in 330 families.

References 

Populated places in Shahr-e Babak County